Giovanni Antonio Burrini (25 April 1656 – 5 January 1727) was a Bolognese painter of Late-Baroque or Rococo style. After an apprenticeship with Domenico Maria Canuti, he went to work under Lorenzo Pasinelli with fellow student, Giovanni Gioseffo dal Sole. He became an early friend and often close collaborator with Giuseppe Maria Crespi, with whom he shared a studio. He became a rival and competitor with Sebastiano Ricci. He painted in Turin for the Carignano family and Novellara. In 1709, he was one of the founding members of the Accademia Clementina in Bologna.

His daughter Barbara Burrini was also a painter. Among his pupils was Bartolomeo Mercati.

Partial anthology of works
Joseph Interpreting Dreams (Muzeum, Warsaw)
Samson and Delilah
Martyrdom of Saint Victoria
Fresco Cycle (Villa Albergata, Zola Predosa)
Martyrdom Of Saint Euphemia (1686, Chiesa Saint Euphemia, Ravenna)
Frescoes (Palazzo Ruini, Bologna)
Frescoes (San Giovanni Battista dei Celestini, Bologna)
Susannah and the Elders (Pinacoteca, Bologna)
Sacrifice of Isaac (Louvre, Paris)
Orpheus and Eurydice (1697)
Frescoes (1695, San Bartolomeo, Bologna)
Martyrdom Of Saint Catherine (Santa Caterina di Saragozza, Bologna)
Immaculate Virgin with Saints Petronius & Dionysius the Areopagite (1684, Chiesa Parrocchiale, Monghidoro)
Adoration of the Magi (Fogg Art Museum, Cambridge, Massachusetts)
Bacchus and Ariadne (Private Collection)
Herminia and the Shepherds (Pinacoteca, Bologna)
Infant Jesus, Saint Joseph, and three saints (Louvre)

References

 Grove Art encyclopedia abstract

External links

1656 births
1727 deaths
17th-century Italian painters
Italian male painters
18th-century Italian painters
Painters from Bologna
Italian Baroque painters
18th-century Italian male artists